Nina Sio (born 21 October 1963) is a former New Zealand rugby union player. She made her debut for the Black Ferns on 22 July 1989 against the California Grizzlies at Christchurch. She was also in the 1991 Women's Rugby World Cup squad.

References

External links 

 Black Ferns Profile

1963 births
Living people
New Zealand women's international rugby union players
New Zealand female rugby union players